Cartagogena is a genus of moths belonging to the family Tortricidae.

Species
Cartagogena februa Razowski, 1992
Cartagogena ferruminata Razowski, 1992
Cartagogena filtrata Razowski, 1992

See also
List of Tortricidae genera

References

 , 2005: World Catalogue of Insects vol. 5 Tortricidae.
 , 1992, Misc. Zool. 14 (1990): 85
 , 2011: Diagnoses and remarks on genera of Tortricidae, 2: Cochylini (Lepidoptera: Tortricidae). Shilap Revista de Lepidopterologia 39 (156): 397–414.

External links
tortricidae.com

Cochylini
Tortricidae genera